Corno Bussola (French: Mont de Boussolaz) is a 3,023 metres high peak on the Italian side of the Pennine Alps.

Toponymy 

In Italian corno means horn, a term which often appears in toponymy with the meaning of peak, summit.  Bussola means compass, but the original name of the mountain in the Valdôtain dialect has no relations with the compass, and its pronunciation is different too (not bùssola as in Italian but bussòla).

The French toponym shows a typical phonetical phenomenon in the French-speaking Alps, that is to say the mute final 'z'.

Geography 
Corno Bussola is located in the Ayas valley and is the main elevation of the ridge dividing two small valleys tributaries of the Évançon: Mascognaz valley (north) and Conca di Palasinaz or Combe de Palasinaz. The lowest point of the ridge, which connects Corno Bussola to the neighbouring Corno Vitello (or Chalberhòre in Walser German), is the Palasinaz Pass (2,688 m). Administratively the mountain belongs to the comunes of Ayas and Brusson. 

Just below the Corno Bussola there is the natural environment of the Palasinaz Lakes.

SOIUSA classification 
According to SOIUSA (International Standardized Mountain Subdivision of the Alps) the mountain can be classified in the following way:
 main part = Western Alps
 major sector = North Western Alps
 section = Pennine Alps
 subsection = Monte Rosa Alps
 supergroup = Costiera Testa Grigia-Frudiera
 group = Costiera della Testa Grigia
 code = I/B-9.III-B.5.a

Access to the summit 

The summit can be accessed starting from the Arp Hut and following a waymarked foothpath which flanks some lakes (Palasinaz lake) and then reaches a pass at 2,805 m (Colletto Bussola or Petit col de Boussolaz), and then leads to the summit climbing its southern flanks. The route requires some hiking experience
From the top of the mountain, where stands a high metallic summit cross, one can enjoy a broad panoramic view encompassing some oth the highest mountains of Western Alps such as Breithorn, Castor, Pollux, Liskamm, Dufourspitze, Testa Grigia, Matterhorn, Corno Bianco and, in the distance, Monviso, Gran Paradiso, Mont Blanc and Grand Combin.

Mountain huts 
 Rifugio Arp (2,446 m).

Maps
 Military Geographic Institute (IGM) official maps of Italy, 1:25.000 and 1:100.000 scale, on-line version
 Carta dei sentieri e dei rifugi scala 1:50.000 n. 5 Cervino e Monte Rosa, Istituto Geografico Centrale - Torino

References

Alpine three-thousanders
Mountains of Aosta Valley
Pennine Alps
Ayas, Aosta Valley
Brusson, Aosta Valley